Louis Longridge (born 5 July 1991) is a Scottish professional footballer, who plays as a winger and striker for Queen's Park.

Career

Hamilton Academical
Longridge played youth football for Barrachnie and Harmony Row, before signing with Bo'ness United in February 2012. After signing for Hamilton Academical, Longridge made his debut in the Scottish Football League for them on 7 April 2012, in a 2–1 defeat against Raith Rovers. In May 2012, Longridge scored twice as Hamilton won the Reserve League Cup Final. He signed a new contract with Hamilton in June 2012, before signing a further one-year extension in May 2013.

In March 2013, he stated that the club was no longer in a relegation fight, and was aiming to get as high in the table as possible. In March 2014 he signed a new two-year contract extension with the club. He moved on loan to Raith Rovers in January 2016, until the end of the season.

In August 2020 he signed for Queen's Park.

Falkirk
In October 2017, he signed for Falkirk on an emergency loan deal until the start of January 2018, whereupon he signed a permanent deal until the end of the 2017–18 season. Longridge left Falkirk at the end of this contract, as the player and the club were unable to agree a new deal.

Dunfermline
In June 2018, Longridge signed for Dunfermline Athletic. He joined the club at the same time as his brother Jackson. After a year with the side, Longridge departed the club in May 2019.

Falkirk (second spell)
Longridge returned to Falkirk in August 2019, signing a short-term contract with the club. He left Falkirk at the end of the 2019–20 season.

Career statistics

References

1991 births
Living people
Scottish footballers
Bo'ness United F.C. players
Hamilton Academical F.C. players
Raith Rovers F.C. players
Falkirk F.C. players
Scottish Football League players
Scottish Professional Football League players
Association football wingers
Association football forwards
Dunfermline Athletic F.C. players
Queen's Park F.C. players